Iskra is a rural locality (a settlement) and the administrative center of Iskrinskoye Rural Settlement, Uryupinsky District, Volgograd Oblast, Russia. The population was 970 as of 2010. There are 13 streets.

Geography 
Iskra is located in steppe, 61 km southwest of Uryupinsk (the district's administrative centre) by road. Kolesniki is the nearest rural locality.

References 

Rural localities in Uryupinsky District